The Free State of Lippe was created following the abdication of Prince Leopold IV of the Principality of Lippe on 15 November 1918, following the  German Revolution. It was a state in Germany during the Weimar Republic and Nazi Germany. After the end of the Second World War, the Control Commission for Germany – British Element (CCG/BE) abolished the state of Lippe in January 1947 and incorporated it into the new German state of North Rhine-Westphalia that had been created three months earlier.

Government 
The Lippe Constitution was passed on 21 December 1920. It established a state parliament consisting of a landtag of 21 deputies elected for a term of four years by universal suffrage. The state administration consisted of a collective three-man Landespräsidium (State Presidency), headed by a chairman, that was responsible to the landtag and could be removed by a vote of no confidence. Technically, the triumvirate as a whole was the head of state and laws were signed by all three members. Nevertheless, the chairman was a primus inter pares, whose function was unofficially equivalent to that of a minister-president, though this designation was not used. For nearly the entire Weimar period, the State Presidency consisted of coalition governments but the chairmanship almost always was held by a Social Democrat.

The last landtag election in Lippe under the Weimar Republic was held on 15 January 1933. Election results placed the Nazi Party in first place with 39.5% of the vote. Nazi propaganda efforts tried to exploit this by presenting it as a great triumph in the lead-up to national Reichstag elections on 5 March. On 7 February, a new administration was formed containing two Nazi members. Ernst Krappe, the economics specialist in the Nazi Party's Gau Westphalia-North, became Chairman of the State Presidency.

On 7 April, the Reich government enacted the "Second Law on the Coordination of the States with the Reich" that established more direct control over the states by means of the new powerful position of Reichsstatthalter (Reich Governor). Alfred Meyer, the Nazi Party Gauleiter for Gau Westphalia-North, was installed in this new post for both Lippe and Schaumburg-Lippe on 16 May 1933. On 23 May 1933 he appointed Hans-Joachim Riecke as the single State President, and when Riecke left three years later, Meyer assumed the position himself on 1 February 1936, with the title "Führer der Landesregierung" (Leader of the State Government) in addition to his Reichsstatthalter portfolio. 

By the provisions of the "Law on the Reconstruction of the Reich" of 31 January 1934, all state landtage were abolished and the sovereignty of the states was passed to the Reich government. With that, Lippe de facto lost its rights as a federal state, though it continued to exist de jure as an administrative unit of the Reich until the fall of the Nazi regime.

After the war, Lippe was part of the British occupation zone and the state government was restored under the last SPD leader before the Nazi take-over. However, it lost its status as a separate German state when it was merged into the newly founded state of North Rhine-Westphalia on 21 January 1947 by British Military Government Ordinance No. 77. The British established a number of military bases in North Rhine-Westphalia, of which Detmold (HQ and units of 20th Armoured Brigade) and Lemgo (infantry battalion barracks) were located within the former boundaries of the Free State of Lippe. North Rhine-Westphalia subsequently became a part of West Germany upon its establishment in May 1949.

Government Leaders

Chairman of the State Presidency 
 Clemens Becker (SPD, 15 November 1918 – December 1920)
 Heinrich Drake (SPD, 17 December 1920 – 7 February 1933)
 Ernst Krappe (NSDAP, 7 February 1933 – 23 May 1933)

Reichsstatthalter
 Alfred Meyer (NSDAP, 16 May 1933 – 11 April 1945)

State President 
 Hans-Joachim Riecke (NSDAP, 23 May 1933 – 1 February 1936)
 Alfred Meyer (NSDAP, 1 February 1936 – 11 April 1945)
 Heinrich Drake (SPD, 17 April 1945 – 21 January 1947)

See also 
Lippe Landtag elections in the Weimar Republic

References 

1918 establishments in Germany
1947 disestablishments in Germany
Former states and territories of North Rhine-Westphalia
States of the Weimar Republic